This is a list of secondary schools in Luxembourg.

Secondary schools
Luxembourg
Luxembourg